This is a list of fellows of the Royal Society elected in 1773.

Fellows
 Edward Bancroft (1744–1821), American physician and chemist
 Thomas Butterworth Bayley (1744–1802), agriculturalist
 John Bethune (1724–1774), clergyman
 Richard Blyke (died 1775), antiquary
 Patrick Brydone (1736–1818), Scottish traveller
 Charles Burney (1726–1814), music historian
 Jeremiah Dixon (1726–1782), astronomer
 Thomas Dummer (c.1740–1781), MP
 Francis Duroure (1715–1808)
 William Benson Earle (1740–1796), philanthropist
 William Falconer (1744–1824), physician
 Heneage Finch, 4th Earl of Aylesford (1751–1812)
 Sir Thomas Frankland, 6th Baronet (1750–1831), MP
 Alexander Garden (1730–1791),  naturalist
 William Henly
 Alexander, Baron Hume-Campbell (1750–1781)
 John Ives (1751–1776), antiquarian
 John Coakley Lettsom (1744–1815), physician
 Ashton Lever (1729–1788), collector
 John Lind (1737–1781), barrister
 Peter Livius (1727–1795), Chief Justice of Quebec
 Jean-André Deluc (1727–1817), Swiss geologist
 Lucius Henry O'Brien (1731–1795), MP
 Francis Osborne, 5th Duke of Leeds (1751–1799)
 Jacob Preston (d. 1787)
 Jean-Baptiste Le Roy (1720–1800)
 John Smith (1744–1807)
 Jacob de Stehelin (1710–1785), Russian Academy of Sciences
 Watkin Williams-Wynn (1749–1789)
 Other Hickman Windsor, 5th Earl of Plymouth (1751–1799)
 John Yorke (1728–1801), MP

References

1773
1773 in science
1773 in England